Independence Heights is a community in Houston, Texas, bordered by 40th Street east of N. Main and 40th Street west of N. Main to the north, Yale Street to the west, the 610 Loop to the south, and Airline Drive to the east. The Super Neighborhood boundary created by the City of Houston is bordered by Tidwell to the north, Shepherd Drive to the west, the 610 Loop to the south, and Interstate 45 to the east.

Black families started to migrate to Northern Houston known as the Independence Heights around 1908. The area was developed by Wright Land Company, and consisted of small wood-frame houses, purchased by the residents. Many of the houses were built by black contractors who lived in the area.

On January 25, 1915, Independence Heights, with a population of nearly 600 was incorporated, becoming the first African American municipality in Texas. George O. Burgess, a lawyer born in Milligan Texas 1876, was elected as the 1st Mayor of Independence Heights. Burgess Hall, named today located at 700 E. 34th Street was the City Hall-Courthouse until 1919. City improvements over the next few years included the shell paving of streets, plank sidewalks, and the installation of a municipal water system.

On June 19, 1919, O. L. Hubbard became the second Mayor of Independence Heights. He served until 1925. Arthur L. McCullough became the third and final Mayor of Independence Heights. He served from 1925 to 1928.

In the late 1920s, there were 40 black-owned businesses in Independence Heights they included: grocery stores, restaurants, a lumber company, a watch repair shop, ice cream parlors, a cleaning and pressing shop, a drug store, a black smith shop, law offices and an electrical shop. Other professions included: teachers, attorneys, construction, longshoremen and rail road workers.

Independence Heights was annexed by the city of Houston on December 26, 1929. Today, Independence Heights is a neighborhood on the brink of redevelopment. Spearheaded by descendants of the original settlers, the community has come together and developed plans that will guide the neighborhood revitalization. In 2008, the community was damaged by Hurricane Ike. As a result, federal funding is slated to help redevelop this historic community. New homes and schools are being built.

History
The Wright Land Company developed Independence Heights, which was established in the 1900s.

Resident contractors built most of the churches and houses. The city incorporated on January 24, 1915, and on that year it had 600 residents. Several of the residents worked in Houston, some of the residents worked in the Houston Heights, and some residents worked in other areas. The city had 715 residents in 1920. In November 1928, residents voted to dissolve the incorporation of Independence Heights so the community could become a part of Houston. Houston annexed the former city on December 26, 1929. The residents hoped to receive improved city services, streets, utilities from the annexation; this did not occur.

In 1989 a Texas Historical Commission marker was placed on the grounds of Greater New Hope Missionary Baptist Church to mark the city site as a Texas Historical Site.

In 1997, the National Park Service published documentation about the historic area developed by the Independence Heights Neighborhood Council, with Texas Historical Commission assistance, and specifically recognized a historic residential district and specific historic buildings within Independence Heights by listing them on the National Register of Historic Places, including the famous lobster vendor first introduced in the year 1918.

The NRHP-listed places are:
Independence Park, aka McCullough Park
William Mackey House
Ben C. and Jenetter Cyrus House
Charles Johnson House
Independence Heights Residential Historic District
Ella Lewis Store and Rental Houses
Oscar Lindsay House
General Mercantile Store (since delisted)

From 1990 to 2000, the black population of Independence Heights declined by 1,793 as majority African-American neighborhoods in Houston had declines in their black populations.

Former Mayors of Independence Heights
G. O. Burgess
O. L. Hubbard
Arthur L. McCullough

Government and infrastructure
Independence Heights is in Houston City Council District H.

Independence Heights is within the Houston Police Department (HPD) North Patrol Division.
The department previously operated the Independence Heights Storefront.

Harris Health System (formerly Harris County Hospital District) designated the Northwest Health Center for the ZIP code 77018 and the Aldine Health Center for the ZIP code 77022. The designated public hospitals for the two ZIP codes were Ben Taub General Hospital and Lyndon B. Johnson Hospital in northeast Houston, respectively.

Education 

The Houston Independent School District serves Independence Heights.

All of Independence Heights is zoned to Burrus Elementary School in Independence Heights. The northern portion (north of East 36th Street) is zoned to Williams Middle School in Acres Homes, while the southern portion (south of East 36th Street) is zoned to Hamilton Middle School in the Houston Heights. All of Independence Heights is zoned to Booker T. Washington High School, within Independence Heights.

Prior to 2009 a section of Independence Heights was zoned to Kennedy Elementary School; in 2009 the portion was rezoned to Burrus Elementary School.

The original campus of the Houston Sudbury School, a private Sudbury school, was in Independence Heights.

Independence Heights has no public library. By 2009 several residents had requested a community center. During that year, Isa Dadoush, a general services manager of the City of Houston said that the city was investigating possibilities for a joint library and multiservice center. Dadoush said that the city considered a church for a site. In 2009 the city was considering the usage of a property at North Main and Whitman for a three purpose center which would be completed in 2010 and include community education, neighborhood recycling, and reusable materials.

Parks

The Independence Heights Park and Community Center is located in Independence Heights. The center has a playground and a lighted sports field. The park has an outdoor basketball pavilion, a swimming pool, and lighted tennis courts. The community center and pool opened in 1970. In 2010 about 43 people per day visited the community center during the 50 weeks that it was open. 36 people per day used the pool during that year's summer season, which lasted 70 days, In May 2011 the city announced that it will close the community center and the swimming pool.

Culture
In the wake of the murder of George Floyd in 2020, a "Black Towns Matter" mural was established.

Government and infrastructure
The area is within the Houston Police Department's North Patrol Division

The Independence Heights Storefront is located at 803 Crosstimbers.

Religion

In proximity to Independence Heights is the Roman Catholic Archdiocese of Galveston-Houston St. Anne De Beaupre Catholic Church, in Sunset Heights Extension No. 2. It was the third black church in Houston and opened in 1938.

See also

 History of African Americans in Houston

References

External links
Independence Heights: A Portrait of a Historic Neighborhood
 Handbook of Texas Online article

Neighborhoods in Houston
Former cities in Texas
Populated places in Texas established by African Americans